Kajutaijuq: The Spirit That Comes is a Canadian short film, directed by Scott Brachmayer and released in 2014. The film stars Johnny Issaluk as an Inuk man who is threatened when he encounters a malevolent spirit while hunting.

The film was named to TIFF's annual year-end Canada's Top Ten list for 2014.

References

External links
 

2014 films
Canadian horror short films
Canadian supernatural horror films
Films set in Nunavut
Films shot in Nunavut
Films about Inuit in Canada
2010s Canadian films